The May 2010 Quebec wildfires were a series of wildfires that affected over  from late May to June 2010. Smoke from the wildfires caused smog warnings and resulted in heightened air quality indices throughout southern Quebec, including Montreal, Laval, and the Estrie, Montérégie, Lanaudière, Mauricie, and Centre-du-Québec regions; areas such as Ottawa and New England as far southeast as Eastern Massachusetts and Rhode Island also reported poor air quality. The First Nations reserve of Wemotaci, where firefighters were forced to retreat due to the intensity of the fires and density of the resulting smoke, was evacuated, with more than 1,300 residents being temporarily relocated to the neighbouring city of La Tuque. Marcel Trudel, spokesman of Sopfeu—the organization responsible for containing the wildfires—reported that flames as high as  had been observed near the reserve. Three other communities—two of them also First Nations reserves—were evacuated as well. More than 1,200 firefighters worked to control the fires, including 200 from other provinces as well as from the U.S. states of Maine, Massachusetts, New Hampshire and Rhode Island.

See also
List of fires in Canada
List of wildfires

References

External links 
 Société de protection des forêts contre le feu (Association for the prevention of forest fires)
 Air Quality EventSpace for Quebec Fires—crowdsourced information about the wildfires.

2010 05
2010 wildfires in North America
2010 in Quebec
2010 disasters in Canada